Rail transport was introduced to Bangkok in 1893, and the national railway network was developed during the 20th century. Modern rapid transit in Bangkok includes several rail systems: the BTS Skytrain which opened in 1999, followed by the MRT, Airport Rail Link and SRT Red Lines.

History 
Bangkok's first rail line was the private Paknam Railway linking Bangkok to Samut Prakan which opened in 1893. The national railway network was subsequently developed and first opened in 1896, linking Bangkok to Nakhon Ratchasima and then expanding to reach Chiang Mai, Nong Khai, Ubon Ratchathani and Su-ngai Kolok.

Electric trams served the city from 1894 to 1968. In the late 1800s and early 1900s, King Rama V eagerly built a tram network for Bangkok by employing foreign engineers and technicians, especially Danish engineers. However, due to a lack of interest and maintenance, the tram network was completely scrapped in 1968.

Although proposals for the development of rapid transit in Bangkok had been made since 1975, leading to plans for the failed Lavalin Skytrain, it was only in 1999 that Thailand's first rapid transit system, the BTS Skytrain, began operation.

The underground MRT subsequently opened in 2004, the Airport Rail Link began operation in 2010, and the SRT Red Lines began trial operation in 2021.

Inter-city and high-speed rail 

Bangkok is the location of the Krung Thep Aphiwat Central Terminal, the central rail hub for most long-distance trains as of 2023, as well as the older Hua Lamphong station, both operated by the State Railway of Thailand (SRT). From Bangkok, trains travel on the Northern Line to Chiang Mai, the Northeastern Line to Nong Khai and Ubon Ratchathani, and the Eastern Line to Aranyaprathet, and the Southern Line, which terminates at Su-ngai Kolok and has a connection to Malaysia (the other Southern terminus is Thonburi).

High-speed rail 

There are multiple planned high-speed rail lines in Thailand. The Bangkok–Nong Khai high-speed railway and Don Mueang–Suvarnabhumi–U-Tapao high-speed railway are under construction as of 2023. The Krung Thep Aphiwat Central Terminal will act as a future hub for all high-speed services.

Commuter Rail 

In addition to long-distance services, the SRT also operates a few daily commuter trains running from and to the outskirts of the city, and the newer electrified SRT Red Lines.

Mass Rapid transit (Metro Train System) in Bangkok 

Bangkok is currently served by four rapid transit systems: the elevated BTS Skytrain, the underground and elevated MRT, the elevated Airport Rail Link, and the partially elevated SRT Red Lines.

BTS Skytrain 

The Skytrain consists of three lines, totalling : Sukhumvit Line running southwards from Khu Khot Station along Phahon Yothin Road and then eastwards along Sukhumvit Road to Kheha Station in Samut Prakan. The Silom Line runs eastwards from National Stadium Station in Pathum Wan District, then southwest along Ratchadamri, Si Lom, Narathiwat Ratchanakharin and Sathon Roads, crossing the Chao Phraya passing Wong Wian Yai Station in Khlong San towards Bang Wa Station in Phasi Charoen District. Both lines are elevated, and interchange at Siam Station in Pathum Wan. And Gold Line (Bangkok) which run along Charoen Nakhon in Khlong San from Krung Thon Buri Station that interchange with Silom Line to Khlong San Station at the end.

MRT (Metro) 

The partially underground MRT system opened in July 2004, and currently consists of two lines, the Blue Line and Purple Line. It has 38 stations, and connects to the BTS system at BTS stations Mo Chit, Asok, Sala Daeng and Bang Wa. The Blue Line was  extended to form a circle in 2020. The Purple Line opened in 2016.

Although initial passenger numbers were low and their service area remains limited to the inner city, these systems have become indispensable to many commuters. The BTS reported an average of 392,167 daily trips in 2010, while the MRT had 178,334 passenger trips per day. However, relatively high fare prices have kept these systems inaccessible to a portion of the population.

Airport Rail Link 

The Airport Rail Link, opened in August 2010 after many delays, connects the city centre to Suvarnabhumi Airport in Samut Prakan Province to the east. It is operated by the SRT, and offers services between the airport and Makkasan where it connects with Phetchaburi Station of the MRT. It terminates at Phaya Thai Station, where it connects to the BTS.

SRT Red Lines 
The Red Line Mass Transit System Project is a commuter rail system serving the Bangkok Metropolitan Region. Construction began in January 2009 and free public trial operation began on 2 August 2021, with full commercial service beginning on November 29, 2021 when Bang Sue Grand Station opened. It consists of two lines, the Dark Red Line and Light Red Line.

Lines in operation

Future expansion 

The entire Mass Rapid Transit Master Plan in Bangkok Metropolitan Region consists of eight main lines and four feeder lines totalling  to be completed by 2029.

New lines under construction are the Orange Line and two monorail lines - the Pink Line and the Yellow Line - which both commenced construction in 2017, as well as an extension to the Purple Line and extensions to the Airport Rail Link.

Rolling stock

Ticketing and fare rates

MRT Blue line 
There are many types of stored value cards separated by passengers' age. Elder card is for over 65 years olds and provides 50% discount from the full fare. Student card is for under 23 years olds and provides 10% discount from the full fare. Child card is for under 14 years olds and under 120 cm tall and provides 50% discount from the full fare. Adult card is for everyone doesn't provide any discount from the full fare.

The fare rates are counted by the number of stations, starting from 16 Baht for a station, increasing by 2-3 Baht for each station up to 42 Baht for 17 stations.

MRT Purple line 
Use the stored value cards as MRT Blue Line. The fare rates start from 15 Baht for a station, increasing 1 Baht for each station up to 29 Baht for 15 stations.

For the passengers that don't have cards, the fare rates start from 17 Baht for a station, increasing 2-3 Baht for each station, then reach the maximum values at 42 Baht for 11 stations.

Airport Rail Link 
For the city line, the fare rates start from 15 Baht for a station, increase 5 Baht for each station up to 45 Baht for 7 stations.

BTS 
BTS has its own stored value cards called "Rabbit card". There are 3 types of Rabbit card: adult, student, and senior, with 100 Baht initial stored value.

BTS fare rates start from 16 Baht. The costs is based on the distance travelled. Travelling between Wongwian Yai - Bang Wa stations, On-Nut - Bearing stations cost 15 Baht. 15 baht will also be added when travelling between these stations to the other station on the main line. There are now currently free access between Khu Khot - Mo Chit stations, and Bearing - Kheha stations which will not cost any money.

See also 
Rail transport in Thailand
Rapid transit in Thailand

Notes

References

External links 

 
Public transport in Thailand
Bangkok Rail Transport
Rapid transit in Bangkok